David Kendall is the name of:

 David Kendall (director), American director, producer and writer
 David E. Kendall (born 1944), Washington, D.C. lawyer, personal attorney of President Clinton during his impeachment
 David W. Kendall (1903–1976), American attorney, White House Counsel to President Dwight D. Eisenhower
 David George Kendall (1918–2007), British statistician
 Dave Kendall, journalist and VJ